Deception Plateau is a high, ice-covered plateau,  long and  wide, which is bounded by Aviator Glacier, Pilot Glacier and Mount Overlord, in Victoria Land. It was so named by the southern party of the New Zealand Geological Survey Antarctic Expedition, 1966–67, because of its deceptively small appearance when viewed from a distance.

References

Plateaus of Antarctica
Landforms of Victoria Land
Borchgrevink Coast